Burton Elementary School may refer to:

Burton Elementary School (British Columbia), Burton, British Columbia, Canada
Burton Elementary School, in Anglophone West School District in Burton, New Brunswick, Canada